The 1888–89 season is the 15th season of competitive football by Rangers.

Overview
Rangers played a total matches during the 1888–89 season.

Results
All results are written with Rangers' score first.

Scottish Cup

See also
 1888–89 in Scottish football
 1888–89 Scottish Cup

External links
1888–89 Rangers F.C.Results

Rangers F.C. seasons
Rangers